What Makes You Country is the sixth studio album by American country music singer Luke Bryan. It was released on December 8, 2017, by Capitol Nashville. The album includes the singles "Light It Up", "Most People Are Good", "Sunrise, Sunburn, Sunset", and the title track.

Critical reception
The Guardian reviewer Alexis Petridis rated the album 3 out of 5 stars, stating that "you'd have a hard time arguing that What Makes You Country doesn't feature some pretty bulletproof songwriting. If it sounds like mainstream pop in a pickup truck, that's partly because the melodies and structure are up to the standard of the best stuff pumped out by Swedish hit manufacturers." A mixed-to-positive review came from Variety writer Chris Willman, who wrote that the album "suggests that Bryan has zero interest in fixing what ain't broke. It's a 15-song guidebook to What Makes Him Successful, filled with good-time drinking, better-time sex, a little bit of family, and no particular sadness that can't be cured as soon as a certain ex-girlfriend texts back."

Commercial performance
What Makes You Country debuted at number one on the US Billboard 200 with 108,000 album-equivalent units, of which 99,000 were pure album sales in its first week, giving Bryan his fourth US number-one album.  On March 6, 2019, the album was certified gold by the Recording Industry Association of America (RIAA) for combined sales and album-equivalent units of over 500,000 units in the United States. As of April 2019, the album has sold 363,700 copies in the United States.

In Australia, the album entered at number six on the ARIA Albums Chart, becoming his second to reach the top 10 there after Kill the Lights (2015).

Track listing

Personnel
Adapted from AllMusic

Luke Bryan - lead vocals
Perry Coleman - background vocals
J.T. Corenflos - electric guitar
Kenny Greenberg - electric guitar, slide guitar
Greg Morrow - drums, percussion
Danny Rader - banjo, bouzouki, acoustic guitar, resonator guitar, ganjo, mandolin, tres
Mike Rojas - Fender Rhodes, Hammond B-3 organ, keyboards, mellotron, piano, synthesizer, Wurlitzer
Jimmie Lee Sloas - bass guitar
Jody Stevens - electric guitar, programming
Emily Weisband - background vocals

Charts

Weekly charts

Year-end charts

Certifications

References

2017 albums
Luke Bryan albums
Capitol Records albums
Capitol Records Nashville albums